Bike Week is a yearly international event, taking place in different countries throughout the World. It is typically a seven-day event that advocates bicycling for transportation. The event has been steadily gaining popularity in Asian, American and European cities and countries over the past decade. Bike Week has been running in the UK since 1923. 

Bike Week typically takes place in the summer, and runs in the UK during the second week of June, following just after the international World Bicycle Day on 3 June.

It is typically an entire week of cycling events that cover a variety of different types of cycling. The central aim of the event is to create awareness of the benefits of cycling and give those who don't currently cycle the opportunity to help the environment and exercise in a fun and social way. Participants include professional cyclists, celebrities and individuals who choose cycling as a chief means of transportation for the week.

Celebrities that have taken part in the past include Fearne Cotton, Fern Britton, James Cracknell, Jean-Christophe Novelli, Jon Snow, Josie Dew, Olivia Williams, Jeremy Vine and Wayne Hemingway.

UK and Ireland
Bike Week, delivered by Cycling UK, is an annual celebration to showcase cycling. Riding a bike can easily be a part of everyday life and Bike Week is here to inspire people all over the UK to give cycling a try. Bike Week takes place during the second week of June in the United Kingdom, with a parallel event in Ireland where it is known as National Bike Week.

The aim is to get many more people across the UK to give cycling a try, encouraging people to get out on their bikes. In 2019 Bike Week will run between Saturday 8 June to Sunday 16 June.

The concept of Bike Week is "everyday cycling for everyone" and aims to encourage those who wouldn't normally cycle to get on their bikes. Any outing on a bike counts – whether that’s nipping round to a friend's house, cycling to work or school, enjoying a leisurely ride with the family or tackling a cycling challenge.

Every year around 500 events are registered as part of Bike Week, such as family-friendly rides, bike maintenance events, bike breakfasts and group rides, to name but a few. Around 300,000 extra people choose to take part every year, on top of the 2.4 million who already cycle regularly in the UK.

A social media campaign runs through Bike Week called the #7DaysofCycling focusing on different cycling experiences and encouraging everyone to talk about their experiences and raise awareness of the benefits of cycling. Each day has a different theme, from cycling to work to the benefits of cycling on mental health. 

Bike Week is traditionally launched with the annual APPCG bike ride through London, where MP's, peers, and influential members of the cycling industry attend a reception before riding through London. In 2019 this included the inaugural Bike Week summit and was attended by the transport minister Michael Ellis.

United States
In the United States of America, May is recognized as Bike Month and Bike to Work Week  is always either the first or second full week of May. Austin, Boston, Pasadena, Portland, Roseville, Santa Barbara, Sacramento, San Diego, San Francisco, and Washington are among the US cities that actively participate.

Canada
In Canada Bike Week occurs in either May or June because Bike Month is typically from 25 May to 25 June. Calgary, Edmonton, Toronto, Ottawa, Victoria and Halifax are among the cities that participated in 2009. Vancouver participates every year.

See also
 Bicycle commuting
 Bike-to-Work Day
 Bike to Work Week Victoria
 World Bicycle Day

Notes

External links
8-16 June 2019 : Bike Week, delivered by Cycling UK, is an annual celebration to showcase cycling. Riding a bike can easily be a part of everyday life and Bike Week is here to inspire people all over the UK to give cycling a try.
National Bike Week Ireland - 9 to 17 June 2018
Bike to Work Month in Czech - Join thousands of participants in the 9th annual national challenge Bike to Work that takes place in May 
PSA Bike to Work Video - Bike to work day in San Diego, CA is 16 May 2014.

Cycling events
Cycling events in the United Kingdom
June observances